An election to Clare County Council took place on 11 June 2004 as part of that year's Irish local elections. 32 councillors were elected from six electoral divisions by PR-STV voting for a five-year term of office.

Results by party

Results by Electoral Area

Ennis

Ennistymon

Killaloe

Kilrush

Scariff

Shannon

External links
 Official website

2004 Irish local elections
2004